The Battle of Okhmativ or battle of Ochmatów took place around 19 January - 22 January 1655 (January 29 - February 1, N.S) during the Russo-Polish War (1654–67) between the armies of the Polish–Lithuanian Commonwealth and the Crimean Khanate on the one hand and of the Russian Tsardom and the Cossacks on the other.

The Russian-Cossack army led by Bohdan Khmelnytsky and Vasily Sheremetev went to the relief of Uman besieged by the Polish–Lithuanian army. When the commanders of the Polish army Stanisław Potocki and Stanisław Lanckoroński learned about the march of the Russians and Cossacks, they discontinued the siege and together with an army of the Crimean Khanate went out to meet them. Part of the Polish troops led by Szemberg was to guard the Puszkarenko group trapped in Okhmativ, numbering 2000 soldiers, while the main force moved on January 29 in the north. The entire Polish–Tatar army marched in expanded battle array. The Russian-Cossack army went in laager formation. 

On the first day of the battle the Polish and Tatar cavalry clashed with Russian and Cossack cavalry. The cavalry battle was won by the Polish–Tatar side, so that the Russian-Cossack troops standing in laager lost their flank cover. The Russian-Cossack army was besieged. Polish infantry, cavalry and artillery interacting with each other led to the breach in the laager Russian-Cossack army. Khmelnytsky's desperate counterattack saved the Russians and Cossacks from disaster. Under the cover of artillery fire from the four surviving guns (the rest of the guns had been taken by the Poles during the assault) Khmelnytsky moved laager in the direction of hills. In the days January 30 and January 31 Russians and Cossacks conducted two attacks which, however, were repulsed. On the morning of February 1 Khmelnytsky managed to break through to Okhmativ and save Puszkarenko. After this success he retreated to Buky. The Tatars saw futility on the battle and left the field. Deprived of support from the Tatars, the Poles were unable to stop the marching Russian-Cossack laager. Ultimately, the battle was won by the Polish–Tatar side, though the Cossacks and Russians managed to get out of the trap. Through action in this battle the Poles managed to stop a major offensive of the Cossacks-Muscovite and forced them to retreat to the east. The Russian-Cossack troops suffered heavy losses with about 9,000 killed. The losses of Polish–Tatar army were smaller. After the battle Potocki with his infantry and artillery retreated to Lviv, and the cavalry under the command of Stefan Czarniecki moved with the Tatars into the  Ukraine for the purpose of pacification.

References

Further reading
 Історія Української РСР. Т.2, Київ, 1979. стор.78-79.
 Малов А. В. Русско-польская война 1654—1667 гг. М.: Цейхгауз, 2006 г. 

Okhmativ 1655
1655 in Europe
Okhmativ
History of Cherkasy Oblast